is a collection of Masamune Shirow's full color works. The volume itself is 148 210 mm x 285 mm pages. It encompasses 226 illustrations from 1981 to 1991, 193 of which are in full color. It is a wide ranging collection, as one might expect from a work surveying 10 years of a professional artist’s life. The foreword written by Masamune Shirow indicates that only a small sample of works is not represented, some works done for fanzines, or sent off to other individuals, and 34 color pages were left out from Ghost in the Shell because he felt that might devalue that work. Everything from Appleseed to Orion are well represented in Intron Depot 1, some pictures are reproductions of paintings, others book covers, manga pages, or drafts. One feature of Intron Depot 1 is that all of the works are presented with a small aside from Shirow as to his thoughts on them. Another is that he includes a number of what he considers to be his mistakes, and is generally very critical of his work over all.

The commentary itself is somewhat whimsical in tone. It might present some seed of inspiration for an image, critique, or ponder the functionality of a pictured object, or provide some perspective on technique, story, or history associated with the work.

Intron Depot 1 in two spots in particular is quite graphic. One panel involves a graphic drawing of a lesbian ménage à trois, and another significant gore. On balance it is a collection of guns, swords, girls, gadgets, cyborgs, and mecha.

Chapters
Poster (3)
Contents (2)
Appleseed (43)
Black Magic (10)
Black Magic M-66 (10)
Game & Etc. (15)
Ghost in the Shell (39)
Dominion (19)
Cover & Etc. (34)
Orion (17)
Monochrome (14)

External links
 Dark Horse Comics

Masamune Shirow